St. Clement's School (SCS) is an Anglican independent school for girls in Toronto, Ontario, Canada. The school was founded in 1901 by Canon Thomas Wesley Powell, Rector of St. Clement's Church, and was originally co-ed, but switched to being all-girls after the First World War. Students at SCS are often referred to as Clementines.

In 2006, the school completed a new addition to the building which doubled the size of the school: the addition was funded by the Bigger Blazer Campaign. The renovation included a new gym, performance hall, library and many other improvements.

The school is a member of the Round Square affiliation of schools, and it offers the most Advanced Placement courses of any girls' school in Canada.

House system 
Houses at St. Clement's School are named after four Royal British houses: York (yellow, lion mascot), Stuart (green, frog mascot), Windsor (purple, walrus mascot) and Tudor (red, elephant mascot). The House Cup is awarded to the house that has the most points at the end of the school year.

Notable alumnae
 Adrienne Arsenault, foreign correspondent for the Canadian Broadcasting Corporation
 Claudia Brabazon, crown counsel and comedian
 Claudia Dey, novelist, playwright and columnist
 Helena Jaczek, politician and physician
 Sheila Heti, novelist, playwright, and author
 Margaret MacMillan, historian, provost, professor, and author
 Sara Rotenberg, Rhodes Scholar and health equity researcher

Clubs and activities 
Activities and clubs offered by the school include the Philosophy Club, Duke of Edinburgh's Award, Ontario Model Parliament and the Classics Club (which brings students to the Ontario Student Classics Conference at Brock University every year). St. Clement's also has musical ensembles including Primary Choir, Junior Choir, Senior Choir, Chamber Choir, Senior Concert Band, and Senior Jazz Band.

Interschool athletic teams

Round Square 
St. Clement's School has been a member of Round Square since 2002. It is one of more than 60 schools worldwide.

Edsby 
Edsby is a website that is used by the St. Clement's community. Students, teachers, staff and parents may log into their accounts to keep up to date on school events, announcements, classes, and group activities. Teachers regularly update their course pages for a digital copy of the work covered during class. They also post the required homework and upcoming summatives.

References

External links 
 
 St. Clement's Edsby website

High schools in Toronto
Private schools in Toronto
Anglican schools in Canada
Girls' schools in Canada
Round Square schools
Educational institutions established in 1901
1901 establishments in Ontario